is a railway station located in Atsubetsu-ku, Sapporo, Hokkaidō, Japan. The station is numbered A04.

Lines
Atsubetsu Station is served by Hakodate Main Line.

Station layout
The station consists of one side platform and one island platform serving three tracks. The station has automated ticket machines, automated turnstiles which accept Kitaca, and a "Midori no Madoguchi" staffed ticket office.

Platforms

Adjacent stations

Surrounding area
Subway Shin-Sapporo Station (Tōzai Line)
 (to Asahikawa)
Sapporo Ryūtsū Center (AXES Sapporo)
Atsubetsu-Nishi Post Office
Shinano Atsubetsu Police Station
Sapporo City Agricultural Cooperative Association (JA Sapporo), Atsubetsu branch
Hokumon shinkin Bank Atsubetsu-Nishi branch

References

External links
 Atsubetsu JR Hokkaido map

Railway stations in Japan opened in 1894
Railway stations in Sapporo